Dag Solstad (born 16 July 1941) is a Norwegian novelist, short-story writer, and dramatist whose work has been translated into 20 languages. He has written nearly 30 books and is the only author to have received the Norwegian Literary Critics' Award three times.

His awards include the Mads Wiel Nygaards Endowment in 1969, the Nordic Council's Literature Prize in 1989, for Roman 1987 and the Brage Prize in 2006 for Armand V. Solstad is among Norway's top-ranked authors of his generation. His early books were considered somewhat controversial, due to their political emphasis (leaning towards the Marxist–Leninist side of the political spectrum). Dag Solstad lives part-time in Berlin and part-time in Oslo.

Personal life 
Solstad was born in Sandefjord to merchant Ole Modal Solstad and Ragna Sofie Tveitan. His first marriage was to Erna Irene Asp, from 1968. From 1983 to 1990 he was married Tone Elisabeth Melgård. In 1995 he married journalist Therese Bjørneboe, and is thus son-in-law of writer Jens Bjørneboe.

Selected works

In 16.07.41 (2002), he tells the story in the first-person narrative, of his long and frequent walks through the streets of Berlin. However, the story is at the same time a journey in pursuit of a father-son relationship.

T. Singer (1999) is a story about a 34-year-old librarian who leaves Oslo in search of a satisfying and anonymous life in a smaller town.  He marries a single mother and at first feels contented in his invisible role as husband and stepfather.  However, after two years, Singer files for divorce; she is later killed in a car accident.  He returns to Oslo with his stepdaughter where they live together but lead separate lives.  Singer broods and becomes very alone yet feels content in the fact that he has chosen an enigmatic lifestyle.  This book contains philosophical and existential observations of someone seeking to authenticate their identity through chosen isolation rather than social integration.

Medaljens forside (1990) is a book on the history of the industrial construction and engineering company Aker Kværner, but the author insists it should nevertheless be considered as a novel, with the Aker company as its main character.

His 1982 novel Gymnaslærer Pedersens beretning om den store politiske vekkelse som har hjemsøkt vårt land was adapted for the screen in 2006 by Hans Petter Moland as Gymnaslærer Pedersen.

Other writings and assessment

With fellow novelist Jon Michelet, Solstad has published a book after each of the FIFA World Cups in 1982, 1986, 1990, 1994 and 1998. The books blend analytic reporting with political and cultural commentary, and are contributions to genuine literature.

Solstad has also published various essays and articles, both for literary magazines and newspapers, and selections of these have been collected and published in three separate volumes.

In her PhD thesis Why So Big? A Literary Discourse Analysis of Dag Solstad's Authorship (University of Oslo, 2009), Inger Østenstad argues from different perspectives that Solstad is Norway's greatest contemporary writer, and uses a version of Dominique Maingueneau's discourse theory to analyse the components of oeuvre, reception, para-text and meta-text that in Solstad's case contribute to his established greatness. Peter Handke, Karl Ove Knausgaard and Per Petterson, three contemporary writers, regard Solstad highly for his literary excellence.

Novels 
 Irr! Grønt! – (1969)
 Arild Asnes, 1970 – (1971)
 25. septemberplassen – (1974)
 Svik. Førkrigsår – (1977)
 Krig. 1940 (War. 1940) – (1978)
 Brød og våpen (Bread and Weapons) – (1980)
 Gymnaslærer Pedersens beretning om den store politiske vekkelse som har hjemsøkt vårt land – (1982)
 Forsøk på å beskrive det ugjennomtrengelige – (1984)
 Roman 1987 (Novel 1987) – (1987)
 Medaljens forside (The Front of the Medal) – (1990)
 Ellevte roman, bok atten (Novel 11, Book 18) – (1992)
 Genanse og verdighet (Shyness and Dignity) – (1994)
 Professor Andersens natt (Professor Andersen's Night) – (1996)
 T. Singer – (1999)
 16/07/41 – (2002)
 Armand V. Fotnoter til en uutgravd roman (Armand V. Footnotes from an unexcavated novel) – (2006)
 17. roman (Novel 17) − (2009)
 Det uoppløselige episke element i Telemark i perioden 1591-1896 : roman (2013)
 Tredje, og siste, roman om Bjørn Hansen (2019)

Awards and prizes
 Mads Wiel Nygaard's Endowment 1969
 Norwegian Critics Prize for Literature 1969, for Irr! Grønt!
 Språklig samlings litteraturpris 1982
 Nordic Council's Literature Prize 1989, for Roman 1987
 Norwegian Critics Prize for Literature 1992, for Novel 11, Book 18
 Dobloug Prize 1996
 Gyldendalprisen 1996
 Brage Prize Honorary Award 1998
 Norwegian Critics Prize for Literature 1999, for T. Singer
 Vestfolds Litteraturpris 2001
 Aschehoug Prize 2004
 Brage Prize 2006, for Armand V. Fotnoter til en uutgravd roman
 Swedish Academy Nordic Prize 2017

References

External links 
Dag Solstad's biography and bibliography at Aschehoug Agency
Dag Solstad at Forlaget Oktober
Solstad bibliography : literature by and on Dag Solstad (National Library of Norway)

Reviews

Dag Solstad, The Art of Fiction No. 230 – interview with Ane Farsethås in The Paris Review, Issue 217, Summer 2016
Marginal Men Take Center Stage in the Novels of Dag Solstad – James Wood in The New Yorker, 15 October 2018. Published in the print edition of 22 October 2018 issue, with the headline "Not Important."
Novel 11, book18 – Paul Binding in The Independent, 12 December 2008
Shyness and Dignity – Boyd Tonkin in The Independent, 28 November 2006

Norwegian essayists
Norwegian Critics Prize for Literature winners
1941 births
Living people
Dobloug Prize winners
20th-century Norwegian novelists
21st-century Norwegian novelists
Norwegian dramatists and playwrights
Norwegian male short story writers
Nordic Council Literature Prize winners
People from Sandefjord
20th-century Norwegian short story writers
21st-century Norwegian short story writers
20th-century essayists
21st-century essayists
20th-century Norwegian male writers
21st-century Norwegian male writers